Alice Priestley (born 1962) is a children's writer and illustrator. She has illustrated or written twelve books, published by Annick Press, Key Porter Books, and Second Story Press.

Born in Toronto, Ontario, Canada, she studied fine art and English at the University of Toronto. Priestley lives in Toronto with her family.

Works

Illustrator
Jessica and the Lost Stories, by Jenny Nelson (1992)
Out on the Ice in the Middle of the Bay, by Peter Cumming (1993)
Winning the Girl of the Sea, by Brenda Silsbe (1994)
Lights for Gita, by Rachna Gilmore (1994)
The Watcher, by Brenda Silsbe (1995)
Clouds on the Mountain, by Emilie Smith-Ayala (1996)
Roses for Gita, by Rachna Gilmore (1996)
A Gift for Gita, by Rachna Gilmore (1998)
Hush, by Anna Strauss (2002)
Mom and Mum are Getting Married, by Ken Setterington (2004)
Rainbows in the Dark, by Jan Coates (2005)

Author and illustrator
Someone is Reading this Book (1998)

References

External links

 
 Alice Priestley at the Canadian Society of Children's Authors, Illustrators, and Performers
 2007 interview (audio) at JustOneMoreBook.com
 

1962 births
Living people
Artists from Toronto
Canadian children's book illustrators
Canadian women illustrators
Canadian women children's writers
University of Toronto alumni
Writers from Toronto